Yesterday, Today, Tomorrow is the second compilation and first greatest hits album by American singer-songwriter Kenny Loggins. Released in 1997, it contains many of the hit singles from Loggins' solo career, including many of his movie soundtrack contributions, as well as "The Rest of Your Life," a preview of his subsequent album The Unimaginable Life.

In May 2000 the album was certified Platinum by the RIAA.

Track listing

Charts

Weekly charts

Year-end charts

References

Kenny Loggins albums
1997 compilation albums
Columbia Records compilation albums